"Don't You Forget It" is an R&B song by Glenn Lewis, released in November 2001. Produced by Andre Harris, it was the first single from his debut album, World Outside My Window. In early 2002, the song became popular after its music video was released. The song, known for its strong Stevie Wonder influence, won the award for Best R&B/Soul Recording at the 2002 Juno Awards.

Music video
The song's music video was directed by Chris Robinson. It features Lewis singing in a room, surrounded by vinyl records of R&B/soul singers of the past. Actress Kent King plays his love interest in the video.

Track listing

12" single
A-side
 "Don't You Forget It" (Main)
 "Don't You Forget It" (Instrumental)

B-side
 "Don't You Forget It" (TV track)
 "Don't You Forget It" (A Cappella)

CD single
 "Don't You Forget It" (Album Version)
 "Don't You Forget It" (DJ Clue Dirty Mix) (featuring Paul Cain)
 "Don't You Forget It" (Nazkar Remix)
 "Don't You Forget It" (Video Version)

Charts

Weekly charts

Year-end charts

References

 

2001 singles
2001 songs
Glenn Lewis songs
Epic Records singles
Songs written by Andre Harris
Music videos directed by Chris Robinson (director)
Songs written by Glenn Lewis
Juno Award for R&B/Soul Recording of the Year recordings
Contemporary R&B ballads